L'arc-en-ciel is a short feature film directed by David Bonneville. It is a co-production by the Calouste Gulbenkian Foundation / David & Golias / RTP2.

The film tells us the story of Quitterie, a 40-year-old European woman, who relives the great love for her deceased 18-year-old Japanese partner by engaging young male strangers into sordid sexual adventures.

Cast
Sofia Ferrão
Carloto Cotta
Nuno Casanovas
Rafael Morais
Jaime Freitas
Takuya Oshima
Ana Moreira

Festival highlights
 Best Actress award at the International Portuguese Language Film Festival MOSTRALÍNGUA (Winner)
 Honourable Mention at the Austrian Film Festival of Nations (Winner)
 Portobello London Film Festival (Nomination)
 Milan ICF International Film Festival (Nomination) 
 Fantasporto International Film Festival (Panorama)
 Bilbao International Film Festival Zinegoak (Nomination)
 Hong Kong Indpanda International Film Festival (Nomination)

External links 
 
 L'Arc-en-Ciel at the Berlinale Talents profile

2009 films
2009 short films
Portuguese short films
2000s Portuguese-language films